Galudra is a village in Cugenang District, Cianjur Regency in West Java Province. Its population is 4504.

Climate
Galudra has a subtropical highland climate (Cfb) with heavy to very heavy rainfall year-round.

References

Villages in West Java